Dewayne Bowden (born 27 February 1982) is a New Zealand cricketer. He played in 33 first-class, 32 List A, and 29 Twenty20 matches for Wellington from 2006 to 2011.

See also
 List of Wellington representative cricketers

References

External links
 

1982 births
Living people
New Zealand cricketers
Wellington cricketers
Cricketers from Nelson, New Zealand